Tarik Biberović (born 28 January 2001) is a Bosnian-Turkish professional basketball player for Fenerbahçe of the Turkish Basketball Super League and the EuroLeague. He primarily plays at the small forward position.

Professional career

Early years
Biberović, who is a youth product of Bosnia's OKK Spars team, drew attention especially with his performance in the Adidas Next Generation Tournament with the Spars team in the 2016-2017 season. Playing four games with Spars in this tournament, Biberović stayed on the court for 32.9 minutes and averaged 17.8 points, 6.3 rebounds, 2.3 assists and 1.3 blocks. Biberović also competed with Bosnia and Herzegovina at 2016 FIBA U16 European Championship, averaging 7.1 points, 4.1 rebounds and 0.9 assists. Tarik played his best match against Latvia in this tournament and scored 16 points.

Fenerbahçe
His potential earned him attention and he wound up linking up with Fenerbahçe Beko, a club that plays in both the Basketball Super League in Turkey and the EuroLeague. He did not appear in any domestic games for the club during the 2018-19 campaign due to license rules, but he did make his EuroLeague debut in the match against Panathinaikos on February 8, 2019 at the age of 18. Not much changed the following year, as he made a few EuroLeague appearances but did not play in any Turkish League games. Also, he played at the Turkish Youth League, a level of competition that can hardly be considered challenging for a prospect of his caliber.

During the 2020-21 season, though, Biberović played a regular role in the Basketball Super League, appearing in 35 games and starting 11. He continued playing sparingly in EuroLeague games, but he did score 13 points — his most in a EuroLeague game — against ALBA Berlin in December of 2020 and, with Fenerbahçe missing several players due to COVID-19, played at least 14 minutes in the club’s three EuroLeague playoff games and averaged 7.3 points and 3.7 rebounds.

Personal life
He was born in Zenica to Bosnian parents.

References

External links
EuroLeague profile
Proballers.com profile

2001 births
Living people
Bosnia and Herzegovina men's basketball players
Fenerbahçe men's basketball players
Shooting guards
Small forwards
Sportspeople from Zenica
Turkish men's basketball players
Turkish people of Bosnia and Herzegovina descent